Sormani is an Italian surname. Notable people with the surname include:

Angelo Sormani (born 1939), Italian Brazilian footballer and manager
Christina Sormani, American mathematician
Gianfrancesco Sormani (died 1601), Italian Roman Catholic bishop
Leonardo Sormani, Italian sculptor

See also
Palazzo Sormani, a public library in Milan

Italian-language surnames